Saint Arsenius the Deacon, sometimes known as Arsenius of Scetis and Turah, Arsenius the Roman or Arsenius the Great, was a Roman imperial tutor who became an anchorite in Egypt, one of the most highly regarded of the Desert Fathers, whose teachings were greatly influential on the development of asceticism and the contemplative life.

His contemporaries so admired him as to surname him "the Great". His feast day is celebrated on May 8 in the Eastern Orthodox church,<ref> {{Cite web|title=Ὁ Ὅσιος Ἀρσένιος ὁ Μέγας. 8 Μαΐου.|url=http://www.synaxarion.gr/gr/sid/3069/sxsaintinfo.aspx|website=ΜΕΓΑΣ ΣΥΝΑΞΑΡΙΣΤΗΣ}}</ref> in the Roman Catholic Church, and on 13 Pashons in the Coptic Orthodox Church.

Biography
He was born in 350 AD, in Rome to a Christian, Roman senatorial family. After his parents died, his sister Afrositty was admitted to a community of virgins, and he gave all their riches to the poor, and lived an ascetic life. Arsenius became famous for his righteousness and wisdom.

There is considerable debate regarding the accuracy of several points in Arsenius's life. Arsenius is said to have been made a deacon by Pope Damasus I who recommended him to Byzantine Emperor Theodosius I the Great, who had requested the Emperor Gratian and Pope Damasus around 383 to find him in the West a tutor for his sons (future emperors Arcadius and Honorius). Arsenius was chosen on the basis of being a man well read in Greek literature. He reached Constantinople in 383, and continued as tutor in the imperial family for eleven years, during the last three of which he also had charge of his original pupil Arcadius's brother, Honorius. Coming one day to see his sons at their studies, Theodosius found them sitting while Arsenius talked to them standing. This he would not tolerate, and caused the teacher to sit and the pupils to stand. On his arrival at court Arsenius had been given a splendid establishment, and probably because the Emperor so desired, he lived in great pomp. While living in the Emperor's palace, God gave him grace in the sight of everyone, and they all loved him. He lived a lavish life in the palace, but all the time felt a growing inclination to renounce the world. One day he was praying, and said, “O God teach me how to be saved.” And God's voice came to him through the Gospel, "For what is a man profited, if he shall gain the whole world, and lose his own soul?" (Matthew 16:26). He left Constantinople and came by sea to Alexandria and fled into the wilderness. When he first presented himself to Saint Macarius the Great, the father of the monks of Scetis, he recommended him to the care of Saint John the Dwarf to try him.

Sometime around the year 400 he joined the desert monks at Scetes, Egypt, and asked to be admitted among the solitaries who dwelt there. Saint John the Dwarf, to whose cell he was conducted, though previously warned of the quality of his visitor, took no notice of him and left him standing by himself while he invited the rest to sit down at table. When the repast was half finished he threw down some bread before him, bidding him with an air of indifference eat if he would. Arsenius meekly picked up the bread and ate, sitting on the ground. Satisfied with this proof of humility, St. John kept him under his direction. The new solitary was from the first most exemplary yet unwittingly retained certain of his old habits, such as sitting cross-legged or laying one foot over the other. Noticing this, the abbot requested someone to imitate Arsenius's posture at the next gathering of the brethren, and upon his doing so, forthwith rebuked him publicly. Arsenius took the hint and corrected himself.
 
In 434 he was forced to leave due to raids on the monasteries and hermitages there by the Mazices (tribesmen from Libya). He relocated to Troe (near Memphis), and also spent some time on the island of Canopus (off Alexandria). He spent the next fifteen years wandering the desert wilderness before returning to Troe to die c. 445 at the age of around 95.

During the fifty-five years of his solitary life he was always the most meanly clad of all, thus punishing himself for his former seeming vanity in the world. In like manner, to atone for having used perfumes at court, he never changed the water in which he moistened the palm leaves of which he made mats, but only poured in fresh water upon it as it wasted, thus letting it become stenchy in the extreme. Even while engaged in manual labour he never relaxed in his application to prayer. At all times copious tears of devotion fell from his eyes. But what distinguished him most was his disinclination to all that might interrupt his union with God. When, after long search, his place of retreat was discovered, he not only refused to return to court and act as adviser to his former pupil, now Roman Emperor, Arcadius, but he would not even be his almoner to the poor and the monasteries of the neighbourhood. He invariably denied himself to visitors, no matter what their rank and condition and left to his disciples the care of entertaining them. A biography of Arsenius was written by Theodore the Studite.

Saint Arsenius was a man who was very quiet and often silent, as evidenced by an adage of his: "Many times have I repented of having spoken, but never have I repented of having remained silent."

Works
Two of his writings are still extant: a guideline for monastic life titled διδασκαλία και παραινεσις (Instruction and Advice), and a commentary on the Gospel of Luke titled εις τον πειρασθεν νομικος (On the Temptation of the Law). Apart from this, many sayings attributed to Arsenius are contained in the Apophthegmata Patrum.

See also
Desert Fathers
Saint Arsenius the Great, patron saint archive
Or (monk)
Scetes
Daniel (monk), disciple and biographer of Arsenius

References

Sources
Attwater, Donald and Catherine Rachel John. The Penguin Dictionary of Saints, 3rd edition. New York: Penguin Books, 1993. .This article incorporates text from the 1913 Catholic Encyclopedia article "St. Arsenius" by A.J.B. Vuibert, a publication now in the public domain.''
Saint Arsenius in Catholic Forum

External links

350 births
440s deaths
4th-century Byzantine people
5th-century Byzantine people
5th-century Christian saints
Desert Fathers